Clément Ancely (born 6 March 1993) is a French professional rugby union player. He plays at flanker for Bayonne in the Top 14.

References

External links
Ligue Nationale De Rugby Profile
European Professional Club Rugby Profile
Bayonne Profile

1993 births
Living people
French rugby union players
Rugby union flankers
FC Grenoble players
RC Massy players
Aviron Bayonnais players
Sportspeople from Béziers